Frank Jensen or Jenssen may refer to:

Frank Jensen (born 1961), former Danish politician
Frank Høj Jensen (born 1945), Danish sailor
Frank Jenssen (born 1969), Norwegian politician
Frank A. Jenssen (1952–2017), Norwegian journalist, photographer, novelist, and musician

See also
Frank Bakke-Jensen (born 1965), Norwegian politician